Lindenthal is a borough of the City of Cologne in Germany. It includes the quarters Braunsfeld, Junkersdorf, Klettenberg, Lindenthal, Lövenich, Müngersdorf, Sülz, Weiden and Widdersdorf. It has about 153,000 inhabitants (as of December 2019) and covers an area of 41.8 square kilometers.

Many parts of Lindenthal are dominated by academic and research campuses, primarily linked to the University of Cologne and the German Sport University. The later has a campus at Sportpark Müngersdorf, next to RheinEnergieStadion and the European College of Sport Science.

The Cologne University Hospital has a vast campus around the Kerpener Straße. Other institutions include the Max Planck Institutes for Biology of Ageing and Plant Breeding Research.

Cologne's Melaten-Friedhof is located on Aachener Straße.

History 
During the Cold War, the headquarters of the I Belgian Corps was located in Junkersdorf.

Subdivisions 
Lindenthal consists of nine Stadtteile (city quarters, in local dialect Veedel):

Transportation 

Lindenthal is served by numerous railway stations and highway. Train station include Köln-Lövenich, Köln-Müngersdorf/Technologiepark and Köln-Weiden West, as well as numerous light rail stations of Cologne Stadtbahn lines 1, 7, 9, 13 and 18. Aachener Straße and Luxemburger Straße connect Lindenthal with the Cologne Ring and Cologne Beltway.

Twin towns – sister cities

Lindenthal is "twinned" with the following cities:

  Benfleet, United Kingdom
  Diepenbeek, Belgium
  Igny, France

References

External links 

 Official webpage of the district 

 
Boroughs and quarters of Cologne
Academic enclaves